Henry Bromley (1632 – 30 September 1670) was an English landowner and politician who sat in the House of Commons in 1660.

Biography
Bromley was the eldest surviving son of Henry Bromley of Holt Castle, Worcestershire and his wife Beatrice Newport, daughter of Richard Newport, 1st Baron Newport of High Ercall and was baptised on 5 March 1632.

He was at Shrewsbury School in 1643, and matriculated at Christ Church, Oxford in 1650. He succeeded to the estates of his father in 1652.  In 1653 he was a student of the Inner Temple.

Bromley was a J.P. for Worcestershire from 1654 until his death. He was commissioner for assessment in 1657 and from January 1660 to 1669 and commissioner for militia in March 1660. In April 1660, he was elected Member of Parliament for Worcestershire in the Convention Parliament.

Bromley was commissioner for oyer and terminer for the Oxford circuit from July 1660 and Deputy Lieutenant for Worcestershire from August 1660. He was one of those recommended to become Knight of the Royal Oak, with an income of £1,000 p.a.

In 1661 Bromley was captain of the horse volunteers and in 1662 he was a commissioner for loyal and indigent officers. He died at the age of aged 38, and was buried at Holt.

Family
Bromley married  Mercy Pytts, daughter of Edward Pytts  of Kyre Park, Worcestershire on 16 May 1654. They had two sons (including William Bromley ) and two daughters. After Bromley's death, Mercy married George Walsh .

References

1632 births
1670 deaths
People educated at Shrewsbury School
Alumni of Christ Church, Oxford
Members of the Inner Temple
English MPs 1660
Members of the Parliament of England for Worcestershire
Deputy Lieutenants of Worcestershire